Huating Lake, also known as the Hualiangting Reservoir (花凉亭水库 Huāliángtíng Shuĭkù), is a large scale reservoir in Taihu County, Anqing City, Anhui Province, People's Republic of China, used for the purposes of flood control, hydro-electric power generation, agricultural irrigation, transport and tourism. The lake is a National Scenic Area, National 4A Tourist Attraction and demonstration site for agro-tourism.

Damming of the lake to create a reservoir began in 1958 and continued until 1962. There was then an eight-year hiatus until 1970 when construction resumed. Fundamental infrastructure was in place by 1976 and the project completed in 2001.

On October 26, 2009, a 2.1 billion RMB, 23 month reinforcement program began at the reservoir.

The reservoir provides irrigation for Susong County, Wangjiang County, Huaining County and the eastern part of Taihu County, a total area of some 1.05 million Chinese acres.

See also

 List of lakes of China

External links
 (In Chinese) Huating Lake Scenic Area (花亭湖风景名胜区)
 (In Chinese) Huating Lake Tourism Website (花亭湖旅游网)

References

Lakes of Anhui
Hydroelectric power stations in Anhui
Tourist attractions in Anhui
Anqing